Juan David Castro Ruíz (born 21 December 1991) is a Mexican professional footballer who plays as a midfielder for Liga MX club Atlético San Luis.

Honours
Atlético San Luis
Ascenso MX: Apertura 2018, Clausura 2019

External links

1991 births
Living people
People from Veracruz (city)
Mexican footballers
Atlético San Luis footballers
FC Juárez footballers
Liga MX players

Association football midfielders